Martin Luhový (born 9 October 1985 in Púchov) is a retired Slovak football forward.

External links
FC ViOn Zlaté Moravce profile
 FC Petržalka 1898 profile

1985 births
Living people
Association football forwards
Slovak footballers
MŠK Púchov players
FC Petržalka players
FC ViOn Zlaté Moravce players
FK Iskra Borčice players
Slovak Super Liga players
People from Púchov
Sportspeople from the Trenčín Region